The 2018–19 Arkansas Razorbacks men's basketball team represented the University of Arkansas during the 2018–19 NCAA Division I men's basketball season. The team was led by eighth-year head coach Mike Anderson, and played their home games at Bud Walton Arena in Fayetteville, Arkansas as a member of the Southeastern Conference. They finished the season 18-16, 8-10 in SEC Play to finish a tie for 9th place. They lost in the Second Round of the SEC tournament to Florida. They received an at-large bid to the National Invitation Tournament where they defeated Providence in the First Round before losing in the Second Round to Indiana.

On March 26, 2019, Arkansas athletic director Hunter Yurachek fired Anderson.

Previous season

Arkansas finished the season 23–12, 10–8 in SEC play to finish in a three-way tie for fourth place. As the No. 6 seed in the SEC tournament, the Razorbacks defeated South Carolina and Florida before losing in the semifinals to Tennessee. They received an at-large bid to the NCAA tournament where they lost in the first round to Butler.

Senior guard Jaylen Barford was named first team All-SEC, while senior guard Daryl Macon was a second team All-SEC selection. Freshman center Daniel Gafford was named to the SEC All-Freshman Team. On March 26, 2018, Gafford announced he would forgo the 2018 NBA draft, and would be returning to Arkansas for his sophomore season.

Offseason

Departures

2018 recruiting class

Roster
 
 

Connors State College

Schedule and results

|-
!colspan=12 style=|Exhibition

|-
!colspan=12 style=|Regular season

|-
!colspan=12 style=| SEC Tournament

|-
!colspan=12 style=| NIT

References

Arkansas
Arkansas Razorbacks men's basketball seasons
Arkansas